Michael Schick (born 29 February 1988, in Bad Cannstatt) is a German footballer who plays for TV Oeffingen.

Career
He made his professional debut in the 2. Bundesliga for 1860 Munich on 1 March 2009 where he started in a game against FC St. Pauli. At the end of the 2008–09 season, Schick transferred to FC Augsburg. He signed a three-year contract, joining the club on 1 July 2009 and left the team after just one year to sign for SV Sandhausen. Two years later he signed for Wacker Burghausen.

References

External links
Profile at TSV1860.de 
 

1988 births
Living people
German footballers
TSV 1860 Munich II players
TSV 1860 Munich players
Association football defenders
FC Augsburg players
SV Sandhausen players
SV Wacker Burghausen players
2. Bundesliga players
3. Liga players
Footballers from Stuttgart
Fellows of the American Physical Society